Muhamad Said bin Jonit is a Malaysian politician. He is the Member of Johor State Legislative Assembly for Mahkota after winning it in the 2018 Johor state election.

Politics 
He had been a member of PAS before joining AMANAH and had participated in the 2013 Malaysian general election. He was the Chief of AMANAH Simpang Renggam branch. On 27 February 2021, Senggarang state assemblyman, Khairuddin had announced that he had left AMANAH and joined PKR, together with Muhamad Said and Serom state assemblyman, Faizul Amri.

Election results

Reference 

People's Justice Party (Malaysia) politicians
Malaysian people of Malay descent
Living people
Year of birth missing (living people)
Members of the Johor State Legislative Assembly